Shorty McShorts' Shorts is an American animated anthology series, which consisted of 4-/5-minute shorts. It aired from July 28, 2006, to May 25, 2007.

Summary
The host of the show is Shorty McShorts. His name is often shortened to "Shorty" or "SMS", which appears on the hat that he wears. He also wears blue shorts and is the train conductor for his own Short Line. He appeared in advertisements for the show and in the introduction and conclusion of each short where he also does not appear in any of the shorts.

The show takes the form of a Saturday morning cartoon as the shorts that are shown could very well be installments of their own miniseries. The Boyz on Da Run shorts appear in a certain order and have three episodes attached as a miniseries with a fourth one that never appeared on TV. The other episodes do belong to their own miniseries, but the way the shorts are set up suggests that more installments under the same name could be produced.

The series finale "Flip-Flopped" was scored by The Apples in Stereo frontman Robert Schneider.

Broadcast history
The series mainly received mixed reviews. Episodes premiered week after week until the 6th episode. The third part of the "Boyz on Da Run" miniseries was the last episode of Season 1, having aired on September 29, 2006.

The show went into hiatus until April 2007. During the meantime, another short series, Minuscule, filled in as a substitute for Shorty McShorts' Shorts during its hiatus. The second season was on air for only a limited time, as it aired new episodes only for one month straight (April 20, 2007 - May 25, 2007).

Shorty McShorts' Shorts was last shown in May 2007, before being completely cancelled. Reruns were rarely shown, and were used mainly as time slot fillers until they stopped airing altogether. Although 22 shorts were produced, only 13 were aired.

The short Fish Tale would later be reworked into Fish Hooks in 2010, while the other short SheZow! was later revived as a TV series on Hub Network.

Series overview

Episodes

Season 1 (2006)

Season 2 (2007)

Unreleased
 Catch One Up! by Gabe Swarr and Ricky Garduno (voice actors: Carlos Alazraqui, Tara Strong, Tom Kenny)
 Fish Tale by Noah Z. Jones; reworked into Fish Hooks (voice actors: Kyle Massey, Noah Z. Jones, Alex Hirsch, Chelsea Kane)
 Got Your Nose by Brandon Ragnar Johnson (voice actors: Dee Bradley Baker, Richard Steven Horvitz, Alan Oppenheimer)
 Grungy McGee by Anna Chambers (voice actors: Lacey Chabert, Anna Chambers, Charlie Schlatter, Richard Tatum)
 Intergredients by Roque Ballesteros, Alan Lau and Brad Rau (voice actors: Mae Whitman, Bobby Lee, Matt Kaminsky, Roger L. Jackson)
 Bad Hair Daze by Noel Tolentino (voice actors: Selena Gomez, Jason Dolley, Mae Whitman, Scott Menville)
 Lumber Jacksons by Ricardo Curtis (voice actors: Wayne Brady, Masasa Moyo, James Sie)
 Little Man Dan And His Big Fat Hand by Mitch Schauer and Richard Steven Horvitz (voice actors: Richard Steven Horvitz, Lauren Tom, Vicki Lewis)

See also
 What a Cartoon! (Cartoon Network)
 Oh Yeah! Cartoons (Nickelodeon)
 Random! Cartoons (Nicktoons)
 The Cartoonstitute (Cartoon Network Video)
 Liquid Television (MTV)
 Raw Toonage (CBS)
 Wedgies (Cartoon Network)
 DC Nation Shorts (Cartoon Network)

References

External links
 
 
 TV Squad: Shorty McShort coming to Disney Channel

2006 American television series debuts
2007 American television series endings
2000s American animated television series
2000s American anthology television series
American children's animated adventure television series
American children's animated anthology television series
American children's animated comedy television series
American flash animated television series
English-language television shows
Disney Channel original programming
Television series by Disney Television Animation